The Newsboy Legion is a teenage vigilante group in the DC Comics Universe. Created by Joe Simon and Jack Kirby, they appeared in their own self-titled feature which ran from Star-Spangled Comics #7 (April 1942) to #64 (January 1947). In 1970, Jack Kirby introduced a new Newsboy Legion, made up of the sons of the original Golden Age characters.

Fictional character biography

Pre-Crisis version
The Newsboy Legion is a group of orphans, living on the streets of Suicide Slum, selling newspapers to make a living. They were also frequently in trouble with the law, although local policeman Jim Harper had a soft spot for them. In their first appearance, Harper, shortly after becoming Guardian, also becomes the Newsboys' legal guardian. A recurring theme in their stories was that the boys suspected Harper was the Guardian but were unsure.

The Newsboy Legion consisted of Tommy Tompkins (the leader); Big Words (the team genius); Gabby (an excitable kid who never stopped talking); and Scrapper (the tough guy).

The Newsboy Legion were reintroduced in Superman's Pal Jimmy Olsen #133 (October 1970) as part of Jack Kirby's Fourth World story arc. The Legion in that story were the sons of the originals, who were now working at a government genetics project. A new addition to the team was Walter "Flipper Dipper" (or "Flippa Dippa") Johnson Jr., an African-American boy. He was obsessed with and very capable of underwater maneuvers. He is also the son of another member of the Project. His nickname was later shortened to "Flip".

During their first mission, the villainous Morgan Edge develops the Whiz Wagon for the unsuspecting boys. He attempts to use it and them (and by extension, Jimmy Olsen) to kill the Hairies, an underground, technologically advanced society. The Hairies were literally neighbors of the Project and both were near the Evil Factory, which strove to destroy the others. Assisting the Legion in fighting the Factory was a clone of Scrapper called 'Scrapper Trooper', who was designed for military support of the Project.

The boys would become affected by the Project in other ways, such as befriending an experiment from the 'Evil Factory'. They called this large, pink, humanoid entity 'Angry Charlie'. He was the only survivor from the Factory. The police authorities from Scotland, where the Factory had been hiding, allowed the Legion to maintain custody of the entity.

Post-Crisis version

Post-Crisis, the Newsboy Legion's 1940s history was unchanged, as was their later involvement with the DNA Project (now called Project Cadmus). Instead of having identical sons, however, the new Newsboy Legion were now said to be clones, created by the same technology that recreated the Guardian, as part of an Apokolips plot that went wrong. Like the Guardian clone, they shared their "father's" memories, at least up to their current age, meaning that they were sometimes unfamiliar with the modern world (the new Flip's memories dated from the fifties, rather than the forties). They first appeared in this form in Superman (vol. 2) Annual #2 (1988), written by Roger Stern, and were extensively featured in Karl Kesel's run on The Adventures of Superman, including breaking Kon-El out of Cadmus. The clones were always getting into trouble, such as when they hid the existence of a large monster that ate furniture.

The post-Crisis Newsboys were also given real names: Big Words was Anthony Rodriguez; Gabby was Johnny Gabrielli and Scrapper was Patrick MacGuire. They were briefly joined by the Guardian's niece "Famous" Bobby Harper, but she subsequently went to stay with another relative.

The Legion rebel against Cadmus for the first time when they the adults have stolen Superman's body. They join with an infiltration team composed of Lois Lane and several super-powered 'Underworlders', a Metropolis faction devoted to Superman. The group fails to regain Superman's body.

The incident with Harper involved the Legion taking down an operation run by Granny Goodness, an orphanage that was a secret kidnapping ring for the dark realm of Apokolips.

Both versions of the Legion would deal with adversaries such as the insane scientist Dabney Donovan and lackeys of Darkseid. The Cadmus project entire would deal with attacks and manipulation from Lex Luthor's forces.

In Superboy #56, significant changes in Project Cadmus meant the Newsboys, original and clones, left the Project. It was briefly suggested that the clones were investigating what was really behind these changes, but this was not followed up on.

The Newsboy clones rescued Jimmy from the sewers beneath the project in Countdown #29 (October 2007), following his breakout from Cadmus. They allowed Jimmy to stay in the "Legion Clubhouse" (a boarded-up storefront) while he tried to resolve his situation, but he was kidnapped by the second Forager. Their "fathers" were not mentioned.

The group appears in issue one of Death of the New Gods (Dec 2007). Using the Whiz Wagon's computers, they assist Jimmy in gaining photographic evidence of the death of the Black Racer.

In Superman's Pal Jimmy Olsen (one-shot, Dec 2008), the original Newsboy Legion members were killed by Codename: Assassin. The fate of the clones remains unknown. This was part of a long-reaching conspiracy to kill all Kryptonian beings of power, of which there were many at the time. The man in charge of this plot was United States General Sam Lane.

In September 1944, the Newsboy Legion teamed up with the Boy Commandos to stop armed and armored traitors based out of New York City.

Seven Soldiers version
In Grant Morrison's new take on the Guardian in Seven Soldiers: The Guardian, the Manhattan Guardian newspaper has a citywide network of volunteer reporters called the "Newsboy Army".

Later in that same series, a group called the Newsboy Army was active during the forties in an area of New York called Nowhere Street. This group consisted of Captain 7 (an African-American boy in a football uniform), Ali Ka-Zoom (a young stage magician), Vincenzo 'Kid Scarface' Baldi (an Italian boy in an impeccable suit), Chop Suzi (an Asian girl, the team's mechanic), Edward 'Baby Brain' Stargard (an infant prodigy), Little Miss Hollywood (an impressionist, the daughter of Irish immigrants) and Millions (the world's richest dog). In their final mission as a team, they are cursed by the Terrible Time Tailor to be given horrible fates to prevent them from stopping his plans for the Harrowing.

Millions "dies" shortly thereafter. It is widely assumed that Cap impregnates Suzi, as his designation after the encounter with the Terrible Time Tailor is "child molester". However, the crossword puzzle included in Seven Soldiers #1 implies that Suzi may have given birth to twins, fathered by Baby Brain - despite obvious physical obstacles. Cap is subsequently killed by the others. Hollywood becomes an alcoholic 'super-impressionist'. Ali Ka-Zoom masters genuine magic, goes mad, and dies, and Kid Scarface became Vincenzo the Undying Don, the leader of the L.A. underworld and is killed by the Sheeda. Baby Brain survives to found the Manhattan Guardian newspaper. Ali Ka-Zoom has shown up alive in 52. In Seven Soldiers #1, it is revealed that Kid Scarface/Don Vincenzo actually bathed Millions in the Cauldron of Rebirth, and Millions inherited all of Vincenzo's property after his death, becoming the "Dogfather".

The name "Newsboys of Nowhere Street" suggests both the Newsboy Legion and Kirby's later kid gang, the Dingbats of Danger Street.

Doc Savage
Big Words' favorite expression of surprise is "I'll be superamalgamated!" This phrase was originally used by the similarly polysyllabic William Harper Littlejohn in Doc Savage.

The New Golden Age
In the pages of "The New Golden Age" miniseries titled "Stargirl: The Lost Children". The Newsboy Legion are among the lost children on Childminder's island. They mention to Stargirl their history with Guardian.

Collections
DC has published two hardback collections:
 The Newsboy Legion v1, 2010,  (reprints Star Spangled Comics #7-32).
 The Newsboy Legion v2, 2017,  (reprints Star Spangled Comics #33-64).

Other versions
In Elseworld's Finest, the Legion was a small sub-group of Newsboys who counted a very young Jimmy Olsen among their number.

In other media
 The Newsboy Legion make uncredited cameo appearances in the Justice League Unlimited episode "Patriot Act".
 A genderbent incarnation of the Newsboy Legion called the Newsgirl Legion appear in the Young Justice: Outsiders episode "First Impressions", consisting of Tommi Thompkins (voiced by Mae Whitman), Gabi Gabrielli (voiced by Grey Griffin) and Antonia "Big Words" Rodriguez (voiced by Zehra Fazal). This version of the group are a social media-inspired group based in Brooklin, Maine and associates of Tommi's father, Mayor Thomas Thompkins (voiced by Jason Marsden), and Sheriff Patrick Maguire (voiced by Troy Baker), who is based on Scrapper.

References

External links
 Newsboy Legion at Don Markstein's Toonopedia. Archived from the original on March 28, 2016.
 
 
 

Characters created by Jack Kirby
Characters created by Joe Simon
Comics by Jack Kirby
Comics characters introduced in 1942
DC Comics male characters
DC Comics orphans 
DC Comics sidekicks
Clone characters in comics
Fictional gangs
Golden Age comics titles